Notocladonia is a genus of two Australasian species of lichenized fungi in the family Cladoniaceae. The genus was circumscribed by lichenologist Samuel Hammer in 2003. The type species, Notocladonia cochleata, was previously placed in the genus Ramalea.

References

Cladoniaceae
Lichen genera
Lecanorales genera
Taxa described in 2003